David Dolan (born 7 October 1979) is an English professional boxer who has competed at both heavyweight and cruiserweight.  As an amateur he won a gold medal at the 2002 Commonwealth Games in the super heavyweight division.

Boxing career

Amateur
He became British champion at 201 lbs from 2000–2002.

At the Commonwealth Games 2002 he competed at super-heavyweight and beat David Cadieux of Canada in the final, winning 27-20.

Dolan then dropped down again to 201 lbs where he lost in the second round of the World Championships to hard-punching southpaw Viktar Zuyev, who knocked him down twice. Later in the year he split a pair of fights with American star Matt Godfrey.

At the World Championships in 2005, he lost to eventual runner up Elchin Alizade.

Early professional career
Dolan begun his professional career competing at heavyweight and had his first professional contest in May 2006 scoring a four round points victory over Nabil Haciani.  Over the next two years he fought six more times scoring wins over experienced journeymen Paul King, Luke Simpkin, Tony Booth and Lee Swaby.

Prizefighter tournament
On 11 April 2008, with a record of 7-0, Dolan appeared in the first edition of the Prizefighter series on Sky Sports, beating Darren Morgan on points in the quarter final. Before defeating Paul Butlin in the semi-final to set up a final showdown with Martin Rogan, which he lost by a unanimous decision after being knocked down two times.

Move to Cruiserweight
Following the tournament Dolan decided to begin campaigning at the cruiserweight level as he often found himself giving weight away to other heavyweights.  In July 2008 he won his first fight at the weight against the Brazilian Elvicio Sobral and then in October 2008 beat the French fighter Rachid El Hadak to set himself up for a shot at the full British cruiserweight title held by Robert Norton.

British title challenge
On 6 February 2009, Dolan fought Norton for the British title with the vacant commonwealth belt also on the line. The fight took place in the Aston Events Center in Birmingham and saw a total of five knockdowns before ending with a unanimous points victory for the champion handing Dolan only the second defeat of his career.

References

External links
Official website

Profile of David Dolan
British titles
Commonwealth title
World Championships 2003

Living people
Heavyweight boxers
1979 births
English male boxers
Sportspeople from Sunderland
Commonwealth Games gold medallists for England
Prizefighter contestants
England Boxing champions
Commonwealth Games medallists in boxing
Boxers at the 2002 Commonwealth Games
Medallists at the 2002 Commonwealth Games